This is a chronological list of orphan source incidents and accidents.

Note: As incident reporting has used inconsistent units of measurement, here are the conversion factors; metric prefixes are used where appropriate - kilo (k), mega (M), giga (G), tera (T):

20th century

1960s

1962 – Mexico City – 1962 Mexico City radiation accident

January 11, 1963 – Sanlian, Hefei, Anhui, China – A  cobalt-60 source from an industrial seed irradiator was removed from a buried waste repository and taken to a residence by a child. Over the next 5-9 days, six total family members were exposed.  Two died and four were injured.

May 3, 1968 – La Plata, Argentina – A construction worker at a chemical plant discovered a caesium-137 source and carried it in his pants pocket for 17 hours (right pocket for 7 hours, left pocket for 10 hours).

September 18, 1968 – F.R. Germany – An iridium-192 source was mishandled by workers, with one person placing the source in their jacket pocket. Six workers were exposed, with one receiving a  whole body dose and  localized dose to their pelvic and thigh regions.

1970s

1971 – Chiba, Japan – a  iridium-192 source used for industrial radiography was lost.

January 8, 1977 – Sasolburg, Free State, South Africa – a  iridium-192 source fell out of its container at a construction site. The radiographer did not notice the loss of the source and left the site. A construction supervisor later picked up the source and placed it in his shirt pocket. He travelled home and placed the source in a cupboard. The source was recognized as lost two days later after workers were shown a replica and it was recovered the same day.

May 5, 1978 – Setif, Algeria – A  iridium-192 source fell off a truck during transport. Two children found it and kept it for several days before giving it to their grandmother, whom kept it in the kitchen of her home. After 38 days radiation exposure was identified by medical personnel. The grandmother died of radiation injuries, and six members of her family received varying radiation injuries.

November 14, 1978 – Kambalda East, Western Australia, Australia – A density gauge containing Caesium-137 at the Kambalda Nickel Operations was discovered to be missing. Subsequently, Caesium-137 radiation contamination was found at a furnace in Singapore which had accepted scrap metal from the Kambalda operation. After years of negotiation, 119 drums of slightly contaminated waste, holding bricks and sludge from the Singapore furnace were eventually transported to Western Australia in December 1981 and stored in a bunker at Kambalda.

June 5, 1979 – Los Angeles, California, United States – A  iridium-192 source was lost on a job site. A worker picked it up and carried it in his pocket for 45 minutes before giving it to a manager. The worker received a  whole body dose and a  surface dose ( at 1-cm depth) to his buttocks.

1980s

October 5, 1982 – Baku, Azerbaijan – An individual carried a caesium-137 source in their pocket, exposing several individuals. Five people died and 13 others were exposed, including one person who suffered ARS.

1982 – Vikhroli, Mumbai, India – An iridium-192 source was lost during transport. A railway worker who found the source suffered significant exposure.

December 6, 1983 – Ciudad Juárez, Mexico. Ciudad Juárez cobalt-60 contamination incident. A local resident salvaged materials from a discarded radiation therapy machine containing 6,010 pellets of cobalt-60. The transport of the material led to severe contamination of his truck. Remaining pellets in the scrapyard contaminated another 5,000 metric tonnes of steel to an estimated  of activity. This steel was used to manufacture kitchen and restaurant table legs and rebar, some of which was shipped to the U.S. and Canada. The incident was discovered months later when a truck delivering contaminated building materials to the Los Alamos National Laboratory drove through a radiation monitoring station. Contamination was later measured on roads used to transport the original damaged radiation source. Some pellets were actually found embedded in the roadway. In the state of Sinaloa, 109 houses were condemned due to use of contaminated building material. This incident prompted the U.S. Nuclear Regulatory Commission and Customs Service to install radiation detection equipment at all major border crossings.

March 19, 1984 – Casablanca, Morocco – A  iridium-192 source was lost and taken home by a laborer, who placed the source on a table in the family bedroom.  The source remained in the house for several weeks. Eight people died and three were injured.

September 13, 1987 – In the Goiânia accident, scavengers broke open a radiation-therapy machine in an abandoned clinic in Goiânia, Brazil. They sold the  caesium-137 source as a glowing curiosity. Two hundred and fifty people were contaminated; four died.

1989 - The Kramatorsk radiological accident occurred in Kramatorsk in the Ukrainian SSR. A radioactive capsule from a radiation gauge was lost in a quarry; quarried gravel and the capsule were later used to construct the walls of an apartment building. At least four residents of the apartment died before an investigation discovered the capsule in 1989.

1990s

1990 – Sasolburg, Transvaal, South Africa – A cobalt-60 source was left behind following radiography work.  Six people handled the source for approximately 5–20 minutes.

November 19, 1992 – A  cobalt-60 source (which was used for an agricultural project) was taken home by a worker from a well within a construction site which used to be part of an environmental monitoring station in Xinzhou, Shanxi, China. This resulted in three deaths and affected 100+ people. A woman was exposed to radiation while nursing her sick husband. 41 days after the accident, her dose was estimated to be  by means of a blood test. 16 years after the accident, the woman suffered from premature aging. Her then unborn child (induced at 37 weeks, with a birth weight of 2 kilograms) received a dose of almost  in utero; at the age of 16, the child had an IQ of 46. Eight years after the event, her second baby died because of an incident six months into pregnancy.

October 21, 1994 – Estonia – Theft of radioactive material in Tammiku. A caesium-137 source was stolen from a waste storage facility.

1995 – France – A worker disassembled a density gauge at a textile treatment plant and handled a  cesium-137 source for 30-45 minutes.

January 5, 1996 – Jilin, Xinzhou, China – A worker found a   iridium-192 source on the ground. He held it in his hand for 15 minutes before putting the source in his pants pocket. The man received a  whole body dose as well as large localized doses to the left hand, left wrist, and right thigh.

June 1996 – October 9, 1997 – Lilo, Tbilsi, Georgia – 11 servicemen at the Lilo Training Center were hospitalized for symptoms found to be consistent with radiation exposure between April and September 1997. An additional hospitalization in June 1996 was later recognized as having been caused by radiation exposure. An investigation in October of 1997 found a number of sources throughout and around the property, including 200 radium-226 coated gun sights. The primary and most active source, a metal cylinder containing cesium-137 with an estimated dose rate of /h at 1 meter's distance, was found in the pocket of a winter jacket stored in an underground shelter. It was estimated that the servicemen were exposed intermittently via the jacket over a period ranging from 60 to 300 days. It is believed that the radiation sources were training material left over from Soviet use of the installation, and a further 352 contaminated sites were identified within the country during subsequent investigations spurred by this incident.

July 24, 1996 – Gilan, Iran – A radiographer using a  iridium-192 source to check boiler welds at a power plant had the source become detached from the device cable. The source fell into a trench where it was found by a worker who put it into his chest pocket. The worker carried around the source, at times removing it from his pocket and examining it. After approximately 90 minutes he began to experience nausea, dizziness and a burning sensation in his chest; he then returned the source to the trench and left it where he found it. The source was recovered by operators, unaware it had been handled in the intervening period.

December 2, 1997 – Volgograd, Russia – An accidental exposure to an iridium-192 source caused 1 injury.

1997 – Georgia – A medical teletherapy cobalt-60 source was left unsecured near a station, causing a fatal radiation exposure to one individual.

December 1998 – Istanbul, Turkey – two sealed transport packages for spent cobalt-60 teletherapy sources from a shipment of three planned for export in 1993 were instead stored in a warehouse in Ankara, then moved to Istanbul, where a new owner sold them off as scrap metal. The buyers dismantled the containers, exposing themselves and others to ionizing radiation. Eighteen people, including seven children, were admitted to hospital. Ten of the adults developed acute radiation syndrome. One exposed cobalt-60 source was retrieved, but the source from the other package was still unaccounted for one year later. It is believed that the second container was empty all along, but this could not be conclusively proven from company records.

February 20, 1999 – Yanango, Peru – A welder picked up an iridium-192 source lost by an industrial radiographer working at a hydroelectric plant and placed it in his rear pants pocket. The source was kept in the pocket for several hours, then brought home. The welder received severe exposure to the thigh, requiring the amputation of the leg. His wife and child were also exposed to a lesser extent, and the source was recovered shortly after midnight.

April 26–28, 1999 – Henan, China – A radiotherapy unit was sold as scrap to a waste disposal company, where its cobalt-60 source was removed from its shielding. A scrap metal dealer purchased the source, then brought it into his home where he placed it in the bedroom of his wife and child. The family suffered from acute radiation sickness and later recovered. The source was identified and removed 24 hours after its sale.

September 13, 1999 – Grozny, Chechnya, Russia – Six individuals attempted to steal radioactive material from a chemical factory in Grozny. They opened a container and removed several 12-cm rods of cobalt-60, each one . One of the thieves handled one of the rods for several minutes and reportedly died after 30 minutes. Of the remaining thieves, two died and three received radiation injuries.

1999 – Kingisepp, Leningrad Oblast, Russia – The radioisotope core of a radio thermal generator was recovered at a bus station in Kingisepp. Radiation levels at the surface of the source were /hour. The source had been stolen from a lighthouse 50 km away by three men stealing metal to sell as scrap; all three died of radiation injury.

21st century

2000s

February 1, 2000 – Samut Prakan radiation accident: The radiation source of an expired teletherapy unit was purchased and transferred without registration, and stored in an unguarded car park in Samut Prakan, Thailand without warning signs. It was then stolen from the car park and dismantled in a junkyard for scrap metal. Workers completely removed the cobalt-60 source from the lead shielding, and became ill shortly thereafter. The radioactive nature of the metal and the resulting contamination was not discovered until 18 days later. Seven injuries and three deaths were a result of this incident.

May – July 2000 – Meet-Halfa village in Qalyubia, Egypt, where a farmer took a source of iridium-192 home. Two household members died; 5 were injured with skin, bone marrow, and/or muscle damage. An additional 76 others were treated for changes to their blood.

 August 16, 2000 – Samara Oblast, Russia – A  iridium-192 source became detached from its shield assembly while being used by three radiographers to check welds in a gas pipeline. The unshielded source was packed into the workers' vehicle, in which they also slept that night. The next morning all three workers experienced nausea and vomiting. After returning to their base, the loose source was not discovered for eight days.

December 2, 2001 – Lia radiological accident: In the village of Lia, Georgia three lumberjacks discovered two strontium-90 cores from Soviet radioisotope thermoelectric generators. These were of the Beta-M type, built in the 80s, with an activity of  each. The lumberjacks were scavenging the forest for firewood, when they came across two metal cylinders melting snow within a one meter radius laying in the road. They picked up these objects to use as personal heaters, sleeping with their backs to them. All lumberjacks sought medical attention individually, and were treated for radiation injuries. One patient, DN-1, was seriously injured and required multiple skin grafts. After 893 days in the hospital, he was declared dead after sepsis caused by complications and infections of a radiation ulcer on the subject's back.  The disposal team consisted of 24 men who were restricted to a maximum of 40 seconds worth of exposure (max. ) each while transferring the canisters to lead-lined drums.

 November 12-13, 2003 – Kola Harbor, Polyarny, Russia – Inspectors discovered scrap metal thieves had disassembled the radio-thermal generators at two separate lighthouses around Kola Bay. The 5-kg  strontium-90 sources were found, removed from their shielding, nearby.  With their depleted uranium shielding removed, the dose rate for a single source was /hour at a distance of 2-5 cm.  The perpetrators likely sustained radiation injuries or even fatal doses; but authorities were unsuccessful in locating the perpetrators.

 March 23, 2008 – Rades, Tunisia – A worker carried an unshielded iridium-192 source by hand for an unspecified period. The worker sustained a  whole body dose.

April, 2009 – Ecuador – A construction worker picked up a loose  radiography source and carried it next to his left leg for an unspecified period, causing significant localized exposure.

2010s

April 2010 – INES level 4 – A 35-year-old man was hospitalized in New Delhi after handling radioactive scrap metal. Investigation led to the discovery of an amount of scrap metal containing cobalt-60 in Delhi's industrial district of Mayapuri. The 35-year-old man later died from his injuries, while six others remained hospitalized. The radioactivity was from a Gammacell 220 research source which was incorrectly disposed of by sale as scrap metal. The Gammacell 220 was originally made by Atomic Energy of Canada Limited (whose radio-chemical division is now known as Nordion). A year later, Delhi Police charged six DU professors from the Chemistry Department for negligent disposal of the radioactive device.

June 3, 2010 – Turmero, Aragua, Venezuela – An unshielded iridium-192 source was handled by several workers, one of whom received a significant enough exposure to necessitate transport to France for medical treatment.

Officials suspected its provenance to be inappropriately disposed-of medical or food-processing equipment. The rod was sent to Germany for further analysis, after which it was likely to be recycled.

December 2013 – A truck transporting a  cobalt-60 teletherapy source from a Tijuana hospital to a waste storage facility was hijacked near Mexico City. This triggered a nationwide search by Mexican authorities. The truck was found a day later near Hueypoxtla, where it was discovered that the source had been removed from its shielding. The source was found shortly after in a nearby field, where it was safely recovered. The thieves could have received a fatal dose of radiation.

2020s 

 January 2023 – A capsule of caesium-137 went missing from a truck in Western Australia somewhere along a stretch of highway 1,400 kilometres long while being transported between a mine in the Pilbara region and a depot in Perth.

See also
 Acute radiation syndrome
 Nuclear and radiation accidents and incidents
 International Nuclear Event Scale
 List of nuclear and radiation accidents by death toll

References

External links 

Radiation accidents and incidents
Nuclear safety and security